Michael Fernandes may refer to:

Michael Fernandes (artist) (born 1944), Canadian artist and educator
Michael Fernandes (politician) (born 1935), Indian politician

See also
Michael Fernández (born 1994), Puerto Rican footballer